WZLY (91.5 FM) is a non-commercial radio station broadcasting a college radio format. Licensed to Wellesley, Massachusetts, United States, the station is staffed by students of and is owned by Wellesley College. The student organization that hosts radio shows and maintains the broadcast is also known as WZLY.

The station was established on April 20, 1942, as WBS 730 AM. Early programming included radio plays, Porgy and Bess, a quiz show and the news. Today, the WZLY co-operative broadcasts on air at 91.5 FM and on an online radio stream. In addition to radio broadcasting, WZLY also DJs events on Wellesley's campus, hosts parties, and brings musical acts to campus. WZLY also maintains a student blog on their website, which features music reviews, interviews with artists, and music-related reflections.

Transition to internet radio 
In October 2014, WZLY announced that, pursuant to a vote taken during the previous year, the station's programming would move exclusively to Internet radio, with the 91.5 FM broadcast license being sold. The move was made in part because of the difficulty for a student-run radio station to comply with Federal Communications Commission (FCC) regulations.

However, in the spring of 2019, after years of trying to sell the license, the station voted to retain their broadcasting license. WZLY remains on air at 91.5 FM, and streams online as well.

References

External links

ZLY
Wellesley College
Wellesley, Massachusetts
Mass media in Norfolk County, Massachusetts
Radio stations established in 1976
1976 establishments in Massachusetts